JACC: Cardiovascular Imaging is a peer-reviewed scientific journal published by Elsevier for the American College of Cardiology since 2008. It currently has the highest impact factor among journals with a focus on cardiovascular imaging  and it publishes original articles ranging from clinical studies to translational and basic research on novel imaging modalities with potential for future clinical usage. It is indexed by MEDLINE and on PubMed.

Associated journals
 Journal of the American College of Cardiology
 JACC: Cardiovascular Interventions

See also
 European Heart Journal

References

External links 
 

Cardiology journals
Elsevier academic journals
English-language journals
Weekly journals
Publications established in 2008
Academic journals associated with learned and professional societies of the United States